The 2014–15 season was Nottingham Forest Football Club's 149th season in existence and 7th consecutive season in the Championship since promotion in 2007–08. The club also participated in the FA Cup and Football League Cup. The season covers the period 1 July 2014 to 30 June 2015.

Stuart Pearce, who made over 500 appearances for the club as a player, began the season as manager before he was replaced by another former Forest player, Dougie Freedman, on 1 February 2015.

First team squad

New contracts

Player transfers

Transfers in

Loans in

Transfers out

Loans out

Pre-season friendlies

Competitions

Championship

League table

Results summary

Results by matchday

Matches

FA Cup

Football League Cup

Squad statistics

Appearances and goals

|-
|}

Source: Nottingham Forest F.C.

Goal scorers

Source: Nottingham Forest F.C.

Disciplinary record

Source: Nottingham Forest F.C.

References

Nottingham Forest F.C. seasons
Nottingham Forest